Melezitose, also spelled melicitose, is a nonreducing trisaccharide sugar that is produced by many plant sap eating insects, including aphids such as Cinara pilicornis, by an enzyme reaction. This is beneficial to the insects, as it reduces the stress of osmosis by reducing their own water potential. The melezitose is part of the honeydew which acts as an attractant for ants and also as a food for bees. This is useful to the aphids as they have a symbiotic relationship with ants.  Melezitose can be partially hydrolyzed to glucose and turanose the latter of which is an isomer of sucrose.

References

Trisaccharides